Win or Lose is an upcoming American computer-animated television series created by Carrie Hobson and Michael Yates and produced by Pixar Animation Studios for the streaming service Disney+. The studio's first original long-form animated series, it was written and directed by Hobson and Yates from an idea they conceived, and produced by David Lally. The series revolves around a co-ed softball team at middle school named the Pickles in the week leading up to their big championship game, with each episode showing the perspective of each member in the same events for each reflected in a unique visual style.

Will Forte is set to star as lead character Coach Dan. Pixar was developing the long-form original series for Disney+ in December 2020, during Disney's Investor Day, with Hobson and Yates on board. Win or Lose draws inspiration from the conversations between Hobson and Yates, who would have very different reactions to the exact same events upon working on Toy Story 4 (2019). The animation appears to shift, distinguishing itself further from usual fare in each episodes, with Brendan Beesley, Brandon Kern and Tom Zach as head of animation.

Win or Lose is scheduled to premiere on Disney+ in  late 2023.

Synopsis
Win or Lose follows a co-ed middle school softball team called the Pickles in the week leading up to their big championship game. Each 20-minute episode takes the same events from one different member of the Pickles and their perspective as the game approaches such as players, their parents and the umpire, with two stories being showcased in particular.

Voice cast and characters

Main
Will Forte as Coach Dan, the coach of the softball team known as the Pickles.
Other characters included Frank, the umpire who struggles due to his parents yell at him for foul calls, Rachelle, the catcher who is having a bad day when everything goes wrong, and a selfish pitcher who cares about himself until his episode would reveal that he is in love with a girl.

Production

Development
On December 10, 2020, during Disney's Investor Day meeting, Pixar announced an original series titled Win or Lose for its parent company Disney's streaming service, Disney+; it is Pixar's first long-form animated series, as well as the first not to be based upon an existing property, as most of Pixar's television projects are from the short-form. Carrie Hobson and Michael Yates were announced to be creating, writing and directing from an idea they conceived, while David Lally was announced to be producing the project. "It's not so much about softball as it is a comedy about love, rivalry, and the challenges we all face in our struggles to win at life," Pixar's Chief Creative Officer Pete Docter stated. The series will consist of 20 minute episodes. When working on Toy Story 4, Hobson and Yates realized that they had pretty different interpretations of how their creative meetings went, so they used these differing interpretations to develop the idea of an animated series revolving around one event, but with each character having their own conflicts surrounding the event. Hobson explained that Win or Lose has all the humor and heart of a Pixar feature film, but with a different type of storytelling. She also stated: "It's less of a Rashomon and more... You think you know a character, and then you pull back the curtain and reveal they have their own thing going on. ".

On September 9, 2022, during the 2022 D23 Expo, Hobson and Yates presented a first look at the series.

Casting
On September 9, 2022, during the D23 Expo, it was announced that Will Forte would be joining the cast as the voice of lead character Coach Dan, ahead of a first look image released on the same day. Forte's voice performance as Coach was cited as an inspiration of Robin Williams as the Genie from Aladdin (1992). Yates says, "Will was constantly improving. It was an overflow of great stuff. The hardest part was having a five-minute scene with constant belly laughs and having to get it to three minutes!"

Animation
Brendan Beesley, Brandon Kern and Tom Zach serve as heads of animation on the series. Animation is provided with the artist crew that work on the feature films. In each episode, the animation style appears to shift, further distinguishing itself from Pixar's usual fare. For example, Rochelle's story appears to mimic a cardboard diorama, and the actual softball footage mimics that of a traditional sports anime.

Release
Win or Lose is scheduled to premiere on Disney+ in late 2023.

Marketing

On November 12, 2021, during Pixar's special for 2021's Disney+ Day, the first look at the concept art was revealed, offering a sneak peek at some of the characters featured in the series.

References

External links

2020s American animated television series
2020s American television series debuts
American children's animated sports television series
American computer-animated television series
Baseball animation
Disney animated television series
Disney+ original programming
Television series by Pixar
Upcoming animated television series